Verónica Reyes is a Chicana, Latino, LGBT poet from East LA in the United States. She is known for her published book of poetry, Chopper! Chopper! Poetry from Bordered Lives. She won International Latino Book Award 2014 and Golden Crown Literary Society Award 2014 and a Finalist for Lambda Literary Award 2014. She's an AWP Intro Journals Project award winner in 1999 and a finalist for the Andrés Montoya Poetry Prize.

Early life and education 
Born in the early 1970s in East Los Angeles to Natividad Avalos Reyes and Julia Socorro Hernández Reyes, "in the Maravilla area beneath the two jails and near the I-710 Freeway". She has previously lived in El Paso, Texas and in Toronto, but has always come back to East LA area and called it home.

Writing since she was 14 years old, Reyes kept "writing in the moment", but didn't know she was writing poetry. At 18 years old in 1987, she lost her mother and it changed the course of her life. She stated, "It paved my road in life as a poet and educator." When she graduated high school and it was time to enter college, she was unable to do so as she could not get admittance into university due to her English scores. Reyes credits the Educational Opportunity Program with helping her pass the third time. She has since gone on to receive a BA from Long Beach State University (1995) and a MFA in creative writing from University of Texas, El Paso (2000).

Career 
Reyes has worked for El Paso Community College (Rio Grande and Valle Verde campuses), Humber College, Long Beach City College's Upward Bound program, and currently, California State University, Los Angeles

She describes herself as a "Chicana feminist jota poet from East Los Angeles." and states, "I write for Mexicanos, Chicanas/os, for the next generation to see/read pieces that looked like us. That embodied us. I write to add the stories I know and understand and say this is us, the gente from North Sydney Drive. This was how we lived. We exist. We matter. This is our story".

Reyes is a member of Mujeres Activas en Letras y Cambio Social and the Macondo Writers’ Workshop.

Awards and honors 
Reyes won the International Latino Book Award in 2014, Golden Crown Literary Society Award in 2014 and a finalist for Lambda Literary Award in 2014 for her book. Reyes also won AWP Intro Journals Project award in 1999 and was a finalist for the Andrés Montoya Poetry Prize.

Selected works 
Poems and written works can be found in the following published mediums:

Books 

 Chopper! Chopper! Poetry from Bordered Lives

Journals 

 The New York Quarterly
 ZYZZYVA
 Calyx
 Feminist Studies
 Borderlands: Texas Poetry Review
 Canadian Woman Studies
 North American Review
 Pearl Magazine
 Rio Grande Review
 Sinister Wisdom
 Gay and Lesbian Review Worldwide
 The Minnesota Review
 Willow Springs

Selected Poems 

 Desert Rain: An Anointment
 The Hawk
 Bad Flower

References 

Year of birth missing (living people)
Living people
20th-century American women writers
21st-century American women writers
American LGBT writers
LGBT people from California
LGBT Hispanic and Latino American people
American poets of Mexican descent
California State University, Long Beach alumni
University of Texas at El Paso alumni
Academic staff of Humber College
Long Beach City College faculty
University of California, Los Angeles faculty
American women poets
Writers from Los Angeles
Poets from California
American women academics